Der Osten ist Rot is the fourth album by Holger Czukay, released in 1984 through Virgin Records.

Accolades

Track listing 

The seventh track is credited on the album as "The East Is Red", but is in fact a cover of "March of the Volunteers".

Personnel 
Musicians
Holger Czukay – vocals, guitar, bass guitar, organ, mixing, recording
Jaki Liebezeit – drums, trumpet, piano, organ
Michy – vocals, organ
Conny Plank – synthesizer

Production and additional personnel
Harald Hoffmann – painting
René Tinner – recording

References 

1984 albums
Holger Czukay albums
Virgin Records albums